Balabancık can refer to:

 Balabancık, İpsala
 Balabancık, Mudanya